Lokka may refer to:

 Alternate form of Loki 
 Lokka Tattur
 Lokka Reservoir
 Lokka massacre